John FitzGerald, 4th Earl of Desmond (died 1399) was the son of Gerald FitzGerald, 3rd Earl of Desmond.  He married and had one son, Thomas, who succeeded him as Earl of Desmond.

According to Burke, John FitzGerald married Joan Roche, the daughter of Lord Fermoy. On 4 March 1399, FitzGerald drowned at Ardfinnan on the River Suir, returning from an incursion into the territory of the Earl of Ormond..

He was buried at Youghal, and succeeded by his son Thomas FitzJohn FitzGerald, 5th Earl of Desmond.

References

John
14th-century Irish people
1399 deaths
Normans in Ireland
Year of birth unknown
Earls of Desmond (1329 creation)
People from Youghal